Qazvin is a city in Qazvin County, Qazvin Province, Iran.

Qazvin or Ghazvin may also refer to:

 Qazvin County, Iran
 Qazvīn Province, Iran
 Ghazvin, Kurdistan
 Caspian Sea, as it was known by ancient Arabic sources